A transfer DNA (T-DNA) binary system is a pair of plasmids consisting of a T-DNA binary vector and a vir helper plasmid. The two plasmids are used together (thus binary) to produce genetically modified plants. They are artificial vectors that have been derived from the naturally occurring Ti plasmid found in bacterial species of the genus Agrobacterium, such as A. tumefaciens. The binary vector is a shuttle vector, so-called because it is able to replicate in multiple hosts (e.g. Escherichia coli and Agrobacterium).

Systems in which T-DNA and vir genes are located on separate replicons are called T-DNA binary systems. T-DNA is located on the binary vector (the non-T-DNA region of this vector containing origin(s) of replication that could function both in E. coli and Agrobacterium, and antibiotic resistance genes used to select for the presence of the binary vector in bacteria, became known as vector backbone sequences). The replicon containing the vir genes became known as the vir helper plasmid. The vir helper plasmid is considered disarmed if it does not contain oncogenes that could be transferred to a plant.

Binary system components

T-DNA binary vector

There are several binary vectors that replicate in Agrobacterium and can be used for delivery of T-DNA from Agrobacterium into plant cells. The T-DNA portion of the binary vector is flanked by left and right border sequences and may include a transgene as well as a plant selectable marker. Outside of the T-DNA, the binary vector also contains a bacterial selectable marker and an origin of replication (ori) for bacteria.

Representative series of binary vectors are listed below.

Vir helper plasmid

The vir helper plasmid contains the vir genes that originated from the Ti plasmid of Agrobacterium. These genes code for a series of proteins that cut the binary vector at the left and right border sequences, and facilitate transfer and integration of T-DNA to the plant's cells and genomes, respectively.

Several vir helper plasmids have been reported, and common Agrobacterium strains that include vir helper plasmids are:
EHA101
EHA105
AGL-1
LBA4404
GV2260

Development of T-DNA binary vectors
The pBIN19 vector was developed in the 1980s and is one of the first and most widely used binary vectors. The pGreen vector, which was developed in 2000, is a newer version of the binary vector that allows for a choice of promoters, selectable markers and reporter genes. Another distinguishing feature of pGreen is its large reduction in size (from about 11,7kbp to 4,6kbp) from pBIN19, therefore increasing its transformation efficiency.

Along with higher transformation efficiency, pGreen has been engineered to ensure transformation integrity. Both pBIN19 and pGreen usually use the same selectable marker nptII, but pBIN19 has the selectable marker next to the right border, while pGreen has it close to the left border. Due to a polarity difference in the left and right borders, the right border of the T-DNA enters the host plant first. If the selectable maker is near the right border (as is the case with pBIN19) and the transformation process is interrupted, the resulting plant may have expression of a selectable marker but contain no T-DNA giving a false positive. The pGreen vector has the selectable marker entering the host last (due to its location next to the left border) so any expression of the marker will result in full transgene integration.

The pGreen-based vectors are not autonomous and they will not replicate in Agrobacterium if pSoup is not present. Series of small binary vectors that autonomously replicate in E. coli and Agrobacterium include:

 pCB 
 pLSU 
 pLX

References 

Genetics
Biotechnology
Synthetic biology